"Nowhere Fast" is a song, performed by Fire Inc. in 1984 for the rock movie Streets of Fire. An alternate version of the song was recorded by Meat Loaf the same year. The song was written by Jim Steinman.

Fire Inc. single
The "Nowhere Fast" single contains an edit (edited down to 4:11 from the 6:02 album version) and is backed with the Marilyn Martin track "Sorcerer", also from the Streets of Fire soundtrack.  Laurie Sargent performed the lead vocals. Holly Sherwood and Rory Dodd performed the background vocals.

Personnel
Music and Lyrics: Jim Steinman
Lead Vocals: Laurie Sargent
Background Vocals: Rory Dodd, Holly Sherwood and Eric Troyer
Piano: Roy Bittan
Guitars: Dave Johnstone and Mike Landau
Bass: Steve Buslowe
Synthesizer: Larry Fast
Drums: Max Weinberg and Jim Bralower
Drum Programming: Jim Bralower
Additional Keyboards: Jim Steinman

Meat Loaf single

Meat Loaf's more rock-oriented version has an almost entirely different set of lyrics, with only the chorus being the same as the Fire Inc. version.  Meat Loaf's version also has a more prominent guitar being played by Bob Kulick. Meat Loaf performed it live during the Bad Attitude tour along with his touring band, The Neverland Express. At the time of its release, it was only a minor hit, but remains a fan favourite.

The single was also released as a limited edition motorcycle-shaped vinyl. A music video was also produced.

Single versions
12" maxi single
"Nowhere Fast" (6:05) (Jim Steinman)
"Stand by Me" (3:45) (Ben E. King)
"Clap Your Hands" (2:23) (Richard Hartley/Brian Thompson)

7" single
 "Nowhere Fast" (4:00) (Jim Steinman)
 "Clap Your Hands" (2:23) (Richard Hartley/Brian Thompson)

Both B-sides were recorded during Meat Loaf's sessions for The Rocky Horror Picture Show soundtrack, and remained unreleased until this single.

There were four different versions of the 7" single, including a shaped picture disc, a pop-up cover and a gatefold sleeve.

Personnel
Lead Vocals: Meat Loaf
Guitars: Bob Kulick
Bass: John Siegler
Piano & Keyboards, Background Vocals: Paul Jacobs
Drums, Background Vocals: Wells Kelly
Percussion: Frank Ricotti
Background Vocals: Clare Torry, Stephanie de Sykes
Produced by Meat Loaf, Paul Jacobs and Mack

References

Jim Steinman.com was used for the detailed information about this song

External links
 
Nowhere Fast lyrics

1984 singles
Songs written by Jim Steinman
Meat Loaf songs
1984 songs
MCA Records singles
Arista Records singles
RCA Records singles
Song recordings with Wall of Sound arrangements